Umran is a Turkish magazine established in 1991.

History and profile
Umran was first published in April 1991. The magazine is based in Istanbul, Turkey. It covers thought, culture and politics from an Islamic standpoint.

The frequency of Umran was quarterly in the first year. From the second year to 1997 the magazine was published bimonthly. From 1998 its frequency became monthly.

See more

References

External links
Umran

1991 establishments in Turkey
Bi-monthly magazines
Cultural magazines published in Turkey
Islamic magazines
Magazines established in 1991
Magazines published in Istanbul
Monthly magazines published in Turkey
Quarterly magazines
Turkish-language magazines